This timeline of the Israeli–Palestinian conflict lists events from 1948 to the present. The Israeli–Palestinian conflict emerged from intercommunal violence in Mandatory Palestine between Palestinian Jews and Arabs, often described as the background to the Israeli–Palestinian conflict. The conflict in its modern phase evolved since the declaration of the State of Israel on May 14, 1948 and consequent intervention of Arab armies on behalf of the Palestinian Arabs.

Background 

Israel gained independence on May 14, 1948, while a Palestinian attempt to establish a state in the Gaza Strip in September 1948 under an Egyptian protectorate failed, being de facto managed by Egyptian military and announced dissolved in 1959.

1948–1949: Arab–Israeli War

1948–1966 
Between 1949 and 1953, there were 99 complaints made by Israel about the infiltration of armed groups or individuals and 30 complaints of armed Jordanian units crossing into Israeli territory. Several hundred Israeli civilians were killed by infiltrators, and some were raped and mutilated. Israel launched numerous reprisal raids in response. Between 1949 and 1956, 286 Israeli civilians were killed. During the same period, excluding the Suez War, 258 Israeli soldiers were killed. Between 2,700 and 5,000 Arab infiltrators were killed. It is unclear whether these Arabs were really infiltrators or were simply unauthorized crossers, as many Palestinians were crossing into Israel for economic reasons. The Israeli forces necessarily treated anyone attempting unauthorized entry as a potential infiltrator, given the level of bloodshed.

1967–1973

1974–1980s: Palestinian insurgency in South Lebanon

1980s

1987–1991: First Intifada 

The First Intifada began with violence, riots, general strikes, and civil disobedience campaigns by Palestinians spread across the West Bank and Gaza Strip. Israeli forces responded with tear gas, plastic bullets, and live ammunition against the demonstrators.

After the outbreak of the First Intifada, Shaikh Ahmed Yassin created Hamas from the Gaza wing of the Egyptian Muslim Brotherhood. Until that point the Muslim Brotherhood in Gaza had enjoyed the support of the Israeli authorities and had refrained from violent attacks. However, Hamas quickly began attacks on Israeli military targets, and subsequently, Israeli civilians.

The Israeli army killed more than 1,000 Palestinians in the First Intifada whilst 164 Israelis were killed. Allegedly almost half (1,000) of the total Palestinian casualties were caused by internal fighting among Palestinian factions.

1991–present: Peace process

2000–2005: Al-Aqsa Intifada

2005–present: Post-Intifada, Gaza conflict 

After Israel completely withdrew from Gaza in 2005, Hamas and other militants unleashed a barrage of daily rocket attacks into Israel. The city of Sderot, for example, one mile away from Gaza, was hit by over 360 Qassam rockets within a six-month period after Israel's withdrawal. In June 2006, militants from Gaza tunneled into Israel, killing two soldiers and capturing one. Two weeks later, Hezbollah, supported by Iran and Syria, attacked Israel across the internationally recognized Israeli–Lebanese border, killing eight soldiers and kidnapping two, simultaneously launching a barrage of rockets against civilian towns in northern Israel. Israel responded with a military operation that lasted 34 days. After Hamas fired thousands of rockets at Israeli communities and refused to renew a six-month truce, Israel responded with a military operation against Hamas to protect Israeli citizens. The 22-day operation ended on January 18, 2009. In May 2010, Turkish activists with the Free Gaza flotilla tried to break Israel's naval blockade of Hamas-controlled Gaza. In August 2010, Lebanese soldiers shot and killed an Israeli soldier during routine IDF maintenance on the border. Three Lebanese soldiers and one Lebanese journalist were killed in the exchange of gunfire.

See also 

 History of the Israeli–Palestinian conflict
 Lists of Palestinian rocket attacks on Israel
 Military operations of the Israeli–Palestinian conflict
 Timeline of the Arab–Israeli conflict

References 

 
Timeline
Articles containing video clips
Israeli-Palestinian conflict
Palestinian history timelines